Thomas P. Gerrity is the former dean and Joseph J. Aresty Professor of Management at the Wharton School of Business at the University of Pennsylvania. Prior to Wharton, he was the Chairman and CEO of the Index Group.

Early life
Gerrity earned his S.B. and S.M. in EE  from MIT in 1963 and 1964 respectively, attended Oxford University as a Rhodes Scholar, and earned his Ph.D. from the MIT Sloan School of Management in 1970.

Career
In addition to serving as dean of Wharton, Gerrity served as a member of the Board of Directors of Fannie Mae from September 1991 to December 2006 and as the Chairman of the Audit Committee from January 1999 to May 2006.

External links
 Wharton Faculty Bio

Year of birth missing (living people)
Living people
MIT School of Engineering alumni
MIT Sloan School of Management alumni
American Rhodes Scholars
Wharton School of the University of Pennsylvania faculty
American chief executives